Grądzik may refer to the following places in Poland:
Grądzik, Lower Silesian Voivodeship (south-west Poland)
Grądzik, Masovian Voivodeship (east-central Poland)
Grądzik, Warmian-Masurian Voivodeship (north Poland)